Izvaryne (Izvarino) is an urban-type settlement located on the E40 highway in Krasnodon Municipality in Dovzhansk Raion of Luhansk Oblast in eastern Ukraine. It is also an important road and railway crossing point on the Ukrainian side of the Russia–Ukraine border. There are facilities at the crossing for motorcars, lorries, and trains. Izvaryne lies across from the Russian town of Donetsk in Rostov Oblast, not to be confused with the Ukrainian city of Donetsk. Population: , .

The border post became part of protracted struggle between the State Border Guard Service of Ukraine and pro-Russian insurgents affiliated with the Luhansk People's Republic during the rising unrest in Ukraine in the aftermath of the 2014 Ukrainian revolution. Multiple attacks by the insurgents upon the post were repelled. Despite this, the Border Guard was overwhelmed by insurgents on 20 June 2014, and was forced to retreat into Russian territory, where many guardsmen were captured, and later returned to Ukraine. An LPR official said on 25 June that they had gained complete control of the border post. It was reported in July that the post was used by the insurgents as vital link to supplies and reinforcements from Russia. According to the Russian Federal Security Service forty-one Ukrainian soldiers defected to Russia at Izvaryne on 27 July 2014. Ukrainian Defence Minister Valeriy Heletey confirmed that 41 Ukrainian soldiers had crossed into Russia and that this case was investigated.

Demographics
According to the 2001 census, the population of the village was 2,091. 4.16% said that their native language was Ukrainian, whilst 94.88% said that it was Russian.

References 

Urban-type settlements in Dovzhansk Raion
Krasnodon